Vạn Phúc is a village traditionally associated with silk weaving in Hà Đông, 8 km south-west of Hanoi. In Vietnamese it is called both làng lụa Vạn Phúc "Van Phuc silk village" and làng lụa Hà Đông after the larger village ("làng") area name.

It is the best known silk village in Vietnam, and one of the best developed and most visited craft village near Hanoi which has over 90 officially designated handicraft villages.

Dong Nguyen, developer of the viral mobile game Flappy Bird, is from Vạn Phúc.

References

Populated places in Hanoi
Culture of Hanoi
Silk production
Tourist attractions in Hanoi
Communes of Hanoi